Vengeance Is a Dish Served Cold, also known as Death's Dealer, is a 1971 Italian Western film directed by Pasquale Squitieri and starring Klaus Kinski.

Plot
Jeremias was 12 years old when an onslaught on his parents' ranch made him an orphan. He has fought Indians ever since because he considers them responsible for this atrocity. One day, he captures Tune, a young squaw in the wilderness. He brings her to the next city because he plans to sell her as a slave to the highest bidder. Before she is passed on to a buyer, a racist mob tries to lynch her. Jeremias foils this attempts but is taken by surprise later on. Two bandits abduct Tune and leave Jeremias for dead. As soon as he has recovered sufficiently he pursues the misdoers. When he gets at them, it turns out they are associated with a so-called friend of his late father. Jeremias discloses that this presumed friend did not only deceive George Bridger, but also his son Jeremias. The murderers of the Bridger family have been his henchman who had been ordered to mask themselves as Indians.

Cast
 Leonard Mann as Jim Bridger
 Ivan Rassimov as Perkins
 Klaus Kinski as Prescott
 Elizabeth Eversfield as Tune
 Steffen Zacharias as Doc
 Salvatore Billa as Ted
 Teodoro Corrà as Boon
 Giorgio Dolfin
 Enzo Fiermonte as George Bridger, Jim's father
 Isabella Guidotti
 Stefano Oppedisano
 Gianfranco Tamborra
 Pietro Torrisi as Roy
 Yotanka

See also
 Klaus Kinski filmography

References

External links

1971 films
1970s Italian-language films
1971 Western (genre) films
Spaghetti Western films
Films directed by Pasquale Squitieri
Films scored by Piero Umiliani
1970s Italian films